Mammillaria supertexta is a species of cacti in the tribe Cacteae. It is native to Oaxaca, Mexico.

References

External links
 Mammillaria supertexta at Tropicos

Plants described in 1837
supertexta